Carnival of Light is the third studio album by British rock band Ride, released in June 1994 via Creation Records. The album showcased the band's shift from shoegazing to a more traditional, folk rock sound. It was not well received by critics, and by the end of 1994 even the band members had become disillusioned, referring to it amongst themselves as "Carnival of Shite", although in a 2022 interview Andy Bell stated that he had "made peace with it. It’s got a lot of good tracks, like Moonlight Medicine and Birdman".

Track listing

Personnel

Ride 
 Loz Colbert – drums, percussion
 Steve Queralt – bass guitar, Fender Rhodes on "Only Now"
 Mark Gardener – vocals, rhythm guitar, tamboura
 Andy Bell – vocals, lead guitar; piano on "Crown of Creation", "Endless Road", and "Magical Spring"; Hammond organ on "Crown of Creation" and "Endless Road", Fender Rhodes on "From Time to Time"

Additional musicians 
 Jon Lord – Hammond organ on "Moonlight Medicine"
 Electra Strings – strings on "Moonlight Medicine", "1000 Miles", "From Time to Time", and "Only Now"
 Kick Horns – horns on "Endless Road" and "Let's Get Lost"
 The Christchurch Cathedral School Choir – choir on "I Don't Know Where It Comes From"

Charts

References

External links

Carnival of Light at YouTube (streamed copy where licensed)

Ride (band) albums
1994 albums
Albums produced by John Leckie
Creation Records albums
Psychedelic rock albums by English artists